Cristian Ugalde García (born 19 October 1987) is a Spanish professional handball player for Greek club Tatabánya KC and the Spain national team.

He started his career in FC Barcelona's youth teams and he played his first match with FC Barcelona's Senior Team in the ASOBAL League 20 October 2004, just one day after being 17 years old. He played for FC Barcelona Senior team 7 years and won 18 titles. In 2012 he signed a contract with MKB Veszprem for the next 3 seasons, which in his second season as a player in the Hungarian club, has been prolonged for 3 more years until 2018. Ugalde was called up for the first time to play for the senior Spain National Team 15 June 2007 and since then he has played 131 games and has scored 288 goals.
He is a graduate in Sports Science for the Universidad Camilo José Cela in 2018.

Honours

FC Barcelona
 2x EHF Champions League: 2004–2005, 2010–2011
 EHF Champions League finalist in 2010
 3x Liga ASOBAL: 2005–2006, 2010–2011, 2011–2012
 3x Supercopa ASOBAL: 2006–2007, 2008–2009, 2009–2010
 6x Pirenees Leagues: 2005–2006, 2006–2007, 2007–2008, 2009–2010, 2010–2011, 2011–2012
 3x King's Cup: 2006–2007, 2008–2009, 2009–2010
 2x Copa ASOBAL: 2009–2010, 2011–2012

MKB Veszprém
 2x Hungarian Supercup: 2014–2015, 2015-2016
 6x Magyar Kupa (men's handball): 2012–2013, 2013–2014, 2014–2015, 2015-2016, 2016-2017, 2017–2018
 5x Hungarian League Nemzeti Bajnokság I: 2012–2013, 2013–2014, 2014–2015, 2015–2016, 2016–2017
 2x SEHA League winner: 2014–2015, 2015-2016
 1x SEHA League finalist: 2016–2017
 2n place in EHF Champions League: 2014–2015, 2015–2016
 3rd place in EHF Champions League: 2016–2017
 4th place in EHF Champions League: 2013–2014
 2n place IHF Super Globe: 2015–2016

TSV Hannover-Burgdorf
 13th place in Handball-Bundesliga 2019
 4th place in Handball-Bundesliga 2020
 2x semifinalist in FINAL4 DHB-Pokal 2019 & 2020
 Quarter Finals in EHF Cup 2019

AEK Athens HC
 1x EHF European Cup winner: 2020–2021
1x Handball Premier winner: 2020–2021
1x Greek Cup winner: 2020–2021

International
  Gold Medal European Youth Summer Olympic Festival U17 - Paris 2003 
 13th place in IHF World Men's Handball Championship - Croatia 2009 
 6th place in EHF European Men's Handball Championship - Austria 2010
  Bronze Medal IHF World Men's Handball Championship - Sweden 2011
 4th place in EHF European Men's Handball Championship - Serbia 2012
 7th place in Olympic Games - London 2012
  Bronze Medal EHF European Men's Handball Championship - Denmark 2014
 4th place in IHF World Men's Handball Championship - Qatar 2015
  Silver Medal EHF European Men's Handball Championship - Poland 2016

Individual
 Top Scorer at Supercopa ASOBAL: 2009–2010
 Gold Medal of Royal Order of Sports Merit: 2013
 Silver Medal of Sports Merit in Handball for Royal Spanish Handball Federation 2014
 All Star Team of the Final4 of the SEHA League 2016.
 All Star Team of the Final4 of the EHF Champions League 2016.

References

External links
Veszprém Player Profile
 All Star Team of SEHA's FINAL4

1987 births
Living people
Spanish male handball players
Liga ASOBAL players
FC Barcelona Handbol players
Handball players at the 2012 Summer Olympics
Sportspeople from Barcelona
Expatriate handball players
Spanish expatriate sportspeople in Hungary
Veszprém KC players
Olympic handball players of Spain
Handball players from Catalonia
Spanish expatriate sportspeople in Germany